Wooddale Historic District, also known as the Delaware Iron Works, is a national historic district located at Wooddale in New Castle County, Delaware.

Background 
It encompasses six contributing buildings and one contributing site associated with the Delaware Iron Works. They are the Alan Wood House, four workers' dwellings, a banked outbuilding, and the mill site. The works remained in operation from 1826 into the 1870s.

The site was later purchased by the Honorable John Biggs Jr, Chief Justice US Court of Appeals.

It was added to the National Register of Historic Places in 1979.

References

Historic districts on the National Register of Historic Places in Delaware
Historic districts in New Castle County, Delaware
National Register of Historic Places in New Castle County, Delaware